Hlas Česko Slovenska (Czech and Slovak for The Czech / Slovak Voice, literally The Voice of Czecho Slovakia) is a reality singing competition and version of The Voice of Holland for Czech Republic and Slovakia. It is part of the international syndication The Voice based on the reality singing competition launched in the Netherlands, created by Dutch television producer John de Mol. It kicked off on March 5, 2014.
One of the important premises of the show is the quality of the singing talent. Four coaches, themselves popular performing artists, train the talents in their group and occasionally perform with them. Talents are selected in blind auditions, where the coaches cannot see, but only hear the auditioner.

Coaches and Finalists

 – Winning Coach/Contestant. Winners are in bold, eliminated contestants in small font.
 – Runner-Up Coach/Contestant. Final contestant first listed.
 – 2nd Runner-Up Coach/Contestant. Final contestant first listed.

Format 

The series consists of three phases: a blind audition, a battle phase, and live performance shows. Four judges/coaches, all noteworthy recording artists, choose teams of contestants through a blind audition process. Each judge has the length of the auditioner's performance (about one minute) to decide if he or she wants that singer on his or her team; if two or more judges want the same singer (as happens frequently), the singer has the final choice of coach.
Each team of singers is mentored and developed by its respective coach. In the second stage, called the battle phase, coaches have two of their team members battle against each other directly by singing the same song together, with the coach choosing which team member to advance from each of four individual "battles" into the first live round. Within that first live round, the surviving acts from each team again compete head-to-head, with a combination of public and jury vote deciding who advances onto the next round.
In the final phase, the remaining contestants (top 8) compete against each other in live broadcasts. The television audience and the coaches have equal say 50/50 in deciding who moves on to the final 4 phase. With one team member remaining for each coach, the (final 4) contestants compete against each other in the finale with the outcome decided solely by public vote.

The Blind Auditions

Episode 1: March 5, 2014

Episode 2: March 12, 2014

Episode 3: March 19, 2014

Episode 4: March 26, 2014

Episode 5: April 2, 2014

Episode 6: April 9, 2014

The Battle rounds

Color key

K.O. rounds

Color key

Episode 11

Episode 12

Live shows

Episode 13

Episode 14

Episode 15

Episode 16 - Final

Results summary of live shows

Overall
Color key:
Artist's info

See also
The Voice (TV series)

References

External links
Hlas Česko Slovenska Official Czech website
Hlas Česko Slovenska Official Slovak website

Czech Slovak
2014 Czech television seasons
2014 Slovak television seasons
Slovak reality television series
Czech reality television series